Eugene McAuliffe may refer to: 

Gene McAuliffe, American baseball player
Eugene V. McAuliffe, American diplomat